Bandırma Onyedi Eylül University is a state university established in 2015 in Bandırma, Balıkesir, Turkey.

History 
The roots of Bandırma University date back to the Bandırma Faculty of Economics and Administrative Science of Balıkesir University, established in 1993. After the legal establishment of Bandırma Onyedi Eylül University in 2015, the Faculties of Economics and Administrative Sciences, Maritime Studies, Health Sciences in Bandırma, the Gönen Geothermic Institute and the vocational schools in Bandırma, Erdek, Manyas and Gönen were transferred from Balıkesir University to the Bandırma 17 Eylül University. Additionally, the Faculty of Agriculture, Ömer Seyfettin Faculty of Applied Sciences, The School of Foreign Languages, Institutes of Social Science, Science and Health Sciences were newly founded

Academic Units

Faculties 
 Faculty of Economics and Administrative Sciences
 Maritime Faculty
 Ömer Seyfettin Faculty of Applied Sciences
 Faculty of Health Sciences
 Faculty of Engineering and Natural Sciences
 Faculty of Humanities and Social Sciences
 Faculty of Sport Sciences
 Faculty of Medicine
 Faculty of Architecture and Design
 Faculty of Islamic Sciences

Institutes 
 Gönen Geothermic Institute
 Institute of Social Sciences
 Institute of Science and Technology
 Institute of Health Sciences

School of Foreign Languages 
 School of Foreign Languages

Vocational Schools 
 Bandırma Vocational School of Justice
 Bandırma Vocational School
 Vocational School of Health Services 
 Erdek Vocational School
 Gönen Vocational School
 Manyas Vocational School
 Susurluk Vocational School
 Bandırma OSB Technical Vocational School

Rector

Prof. Dr. Süleyman ÖZDEMİR, among the candidates recommended by the Council of Higher Education (Turkey), has been appointed as the Rector of Bandırma Onyedi Eylül University, according to Article 13 of the Constitution of the Republic of Turkey and Article 13 of the Law on Higher Education No. 2547.

References

External links 
 Bandırma Onyedi Eylül University

Universities and colleges in Turkey
Education in Balıkesir
Educational institutions established in 2015
2015 establishments in Turkey